Allen S. Brett is the editor in chief of NEJM Journal Watch, a series of topic-specific newsletters written for physicians and other health professionals. He has been the editor in chief since 1994.

Brett is also Orlando Benedict Mayer Professor of Medicine and director of the Division of General Internal Medicine as well as the vice chair of the department of medicine.

Brett is a physician at the university of South Carolina.

His academic interests include medical ethics, clinical decision-making, preventive medicine, critical review of the medical literature, and health care reform.

Career 
Allan S. Brett studied at the University of Pennsylvania and became a medical doctor there in 1976.

Over the years, he has served on the faculties at Washington University School of Medicine, Georgetown University School of Medicine, and Harvard Medical School.

See also 

 Journal watch 
 Medical doctor
 Medical literature
 Health care

References 

Living people
Year of birth missing (living people)
American physicians
Washington University School of Medicine faculty
Perelman School of Medicine at the University of Pennsylvania alumni
Georgetown University Medical Center faculty
Harvard Medical School faculty